Donje Luge is a small town in the municipality of Berane, Montenegro.

Demographics
According to the 2011 census, its population was 1,841.

References

Populated places in Berane Municipality
Serb communities in Montenegro